Neil Mann may refer to:

Neil Mann (Australian footballer) (1924–2013), Australian rules footballer
Neil Mann (English footballer) (born 1972), English footballer